The Sea of Marmara, also known as the Marmara Sea, is an inland sea located entirely within the borders of Turkey. It connects the Black Sea to the Aegean Sea via the Bosporus and Dardanelles straits, separating the country's European and Asian sides.

Name
The Sea of Marmara is named after the largest island to its south side, which is called Marmara Island because it is rich in marble (Greek  (mármaron) "marble").

In classical antiquity, it was known as the Propontis, which is derived from the Greek words pro- (before) and pontos (sea) and reflects the fact that the Ancient Greeks used to sail through it to reach the Black Sea, which they called Pontos.

Mythology 
In Greek mythology, a storm on the Propontis brought the Argonauts back to an island they had left, precipitating a battle in which either Jason or Heracles killed King Cyzicus, who mistook them for his Pelasgian enemies.

Geography and hydrology
The surface salinity of the Marmara averages about 22 parts per thousand, which is slightly more than that of the Black Sea, but only about two-thirds that of most oceans. The water is much more saline at the bottom of the sea, averaging a salinity of around 38 parts per thousand, similar to that of the Mediterranean Sea. This high-density saline water does not migrate to the surface as is also the case with the Black Sea,. Water from the  Susurluk, Biga (Granicus), and Gönen Rivers also reduces the salinity of the sea, though with less effect than on the Black Sea. With little land in Thrace draining southward, almost all of these rivers flow from Anatolia.

The sea's south coast is heavily indented and includes the Gulf of İzmit, the Gulf of Gemlik, the Gulf of Bandırma, and the Gulf of Erdek.

Islands 
There are two main groups of islands in the Sea of Marmara. To the north lie the Prince Islands, an archipelago made up of the inhabited islands of Kınaliada, Burgazada, Heybeliada, Büyüyada and Sedef Adası and several uninhabited islands including Sivriada, Yassıada, Kaşıkadası and Tavşanadası. The inhabited islands are readily accessible by ferry from both the European and Asian shores of İstanbul and the entire archipelago forms part of the conurbation. 

To the south lie the Marmara Islands, an archipelago made up of the eponymous Marmara Island and three other inhabited islands – Avşa, Paşalimanı and Ekinlik – as well as of seventeen largely uninhabited islands including the prison island of Imralı whose most famous prisoner, since 1999, has been the PKK leader Abdullah Öcalan. These islands lie within Balıkesir province and are most readily accessible from Tekirdağ in Thrace or Erdek on the southern shore of the Sea of Marmara. In high summer additional ferries travel to Avşa and Marmara Islands from the centre of İstanbul to facilitate a growing tourist trade.

There are also a few individual islands elsewhere in the Sea of Marmara, such as Koç Adası, off Tuzla, which is privately owned by the Koç family of industrialists.

Problems facing the Sea of Marmara 
The North Anatolian Fault runs under the sea and has triggered several major earthquakes, such as those in Izmit and Düzce in August and November 1999 respectively. The August 1999 earthquake is commonly referred to as the Marmara Earthquake since its epicentre lay under the Sea and most of the places worst affected by the quake and ensuing tsunami lay along its shores. 

During a storm on 29 December 1999, the Russian oil tanker Volgoneft broke in two in the Sea of Marmara, spilling more than 1,500 tonnes of oil into the water.

In 2021 the shores of the Sea of Marmara were disfigured by mucilage - nicknamed 'sea snot' - caused, at least in part, by the dumping of untreated waste into the water.

Extent 
The International Hydrographic Organization defines the limits of the Sea of Marmara as follows:

On the West. The Dardanelles limit of the Aegean Sea [A line joining Kum Kale (26°11'E) and Cape Helles].

On the Northeast. A line joining Cape Rumili with Cape Anatoli (41°13′N).

Towns and cities
Towns and cities on the coast of the Sea of Marmara include:

Gallery

See also
1509 Constantinople earthquake
1999 İzmit earthquake
Black Sea deluge hypothesis
Kanal İstanbul
Montreux Convention Regarding the Regime of the Straits
Turkish Straits

Notes

References

External links

 "Sea of Marmara" at the Encyclopædia Britannica
 "Sea of Marmara: Where Ancient Myth and Modern Science Mix" at SCIENCE FOCUS – SeaWiFS

 
Ancient Greek geography
Marmara
Marmara
Marmara Region
Geography of Southern Europe
Geography of Western Asia
Landforms of Istanbul Province
Landforms of Balıkesir Province
Landforms of Bursa Province
Landforms of Çanakkale Province
Landforms of Kocaeli Province
Landforms of Tekirdağ Province
Landforms of Yalova Province